John Hutchison may refer to:
Jock Hutchison (John Waters Hutchison, 1884–1977), Scottish-American golfer
John Hutchison (mayor) (1817–1863), mayor of Toronto
John Hutchison (sculptor) (1832–1910), Scottish sculptor
John Duflon Hutchison (fl. 1860s), British merchant
John Hutchison (architect) (1841–1908), Scottish architect
John de Mestre Hutchison (1862–1932), Royal Navy officer
John K. Hutchison (born 1959), Republican member of the Arkansas House of Representatives
John A. Hutchison, current Justice of the West Virginia Supreme Court of Appeals

See also
John Hutcheson (disambiguation)
John Hutchinson (disambiguation)